Michelin stars are a rating system used by the red Michelin guide to grade restaurants on their quality. The guide was originally developed in 1900 to show French drivers where local amenities such as restaurants and mechanics were, the rating system was first introduced in 1926 as a single star, with the second and third stars introduced in 1933. According to the Guide, one star signifies "a very good restaurant", two stars are "excellent cooking that is worth a detour", and three stars mean "exceptional cuisine that is worth a special journey". The listing of starred restaurants is updated once a year.

The first restaurant in the UK to gain a Michelin star was Albert and Michel Roux's Le Gavroche, in London. It went on to become one of the first UK restaurants to win a second star in 1977, and the first to win a third, in 1982. Today it is still open as a two-star restaurant, run by Albert's son, Michel Roux, Jr. In 2010 the Roux family's second restaurant, the Waterside Inn, became the first restaurant outside France to have held three Michelin stars for 25 years. The Roux family was also influential in training and influencing other chefs who themselves have gone on to win Michelin stars; Pierre Koffmann, Marco Pierre White and Gordon Ramsay all went on to open restaurants which earned three Michelin stars after working with the Roux brothers.

As of February 2022 there are 8 restaurants in the UK holding three Michelin stars, with all except L’Enclume (Cumbria) located in London or the south of England.

List of Michelin 3-star restaurants

See also

 List of Michelin starred restaurants
 List of Michelin starred restaurants in Ireland
 List of Michelin starred restaurants in the Netherlands
 List of restaurants in London
 Lists of restaurants
 List of Michelin starred restaurants in Scotland

Notes

Citations

External links
Michelin 3-star restaurants in the UK
Michelin 1, 2 and 3-star restaurants in London

Lists of restaurants
United Kingdom cuisine-related lists